Francis Rule (1896-1982) was an Australian rugby league footballer who played as a  in the 1920s.

Playing career
Rule was a champion  with North Sydney and won two premierships with them in 1921 and 1922. Rule played seven seasons with Norths between 1920-1927. He also represented New South Wales on six occasions between 1923-1925. 

Rule died on 6 April 1982, aged 86.

References

North Sydney Bears players
Australian rugby league players
New South Wales rugby league team players
1896 births
1982 deaths
Rugby league centres
Date of birth missing
Rugby league players from Sydney